Silvia Pardo (1941-2008) was a Mexican painter.

Born in Mexico City, Pardo studied art at the Ibero-American University. She produced illustrations for El Rehilete and Zarza, and in 1953 won third prize in a drawing competition and exhibition under the aegis of the United Nations. She is especially noted for her portraits. Her work has been seen in many solo and group exhibits in Mexico and elsewhere.

References

Mexican women painters
1941 births
Living people
Mexican portrait painters
Artists from Mexico City
Universidad Iberoamericana alumni
20th-century Mexican painters
21st-century Mexican painters
20th-century Mexican women artists
21st-century Mexican women artists